Peter Bell (15 July 1889 in Metz ; † 22 September 1939 in Neuburg an der Donau ) was a German teacher and politician ( NSDAP ). He was a deputy in the Reichstag of the German Reich and in the Prussian Landtag.

Life 
Bell attended the Volksschule in Cologne, followed by the Realprogymnasium in Cologne-Nippes and the Realgymnasien in Düsseldorf and Munich. From 19911 to 1914, he studied German, History and French at the Ludwig-Maximilians-University in Munich, and became a volunteer at the 1st Bavarian Infantry Regiment in 1914. In 1920, after the First World War he received his PhD at the Technical University of Munich. From April 1923 to April 1937 he was a student council at the Realschule in Cham, in the Upper Palatinate. On 1 March 1931 he joined the NSDAP.

Bell represented Constituency 25 of the Nazi Reichstag in November 1933, and in 1933 he became a member of the city council in Cham. From 1933 to 1936, he was the district leader of the NSDAP in Viechtach, where he also served as chairman of the Regentalbahn AG supervisory board. Since 1933, he has also been a member of the Kreistag of Niederbayern-Oberpfalz. In addition, he later became head of the Gaussian Border Office of the Gaussian Bavarian Ostmark of the NSDAP. From April 1937 he directed a real school in Neuburg on the Danube. Concurrently, he was still the regional leader of the Bavarian State Parliament of the Federal Republic of Germany. He died in September 1939 in Neuburg on the Danube.

See also 
 :de:Peter Bell

References 
Joachim Lilla (Editor): extras in uniform. The members of the Reichstag 1933–1945. Droste Verlag, Dusseldorf 2004,  .
Erich Stockhorst: 5000 heads. Who was what in the Third Reich? Arndt, Kiel, 2000,  .

External links 
 Peter Bell in the database of the Reichstagsabgegeordneten

Politicians from Metz
Kreisleiter
Nazi Party politicians
1939 deaths
1889 births
Members of the Reichstag of Nazi Germany
German Army personnel of World War I